BFJA award for Best Female Playback Singer was first awarded in 1965. Sandhya Mukherjee won that for Sandhyadeeper Shikha. Aarti Mukherjee is the most awarded artists with 4 wins. Arundhati Holme Chowdhury and Pratima Mukherjee has 3 wins each. Other singers to win this award two times are - Sandhya Mukherjee, Lata Mangeshkar, Indrani Sen and Shreya Ghoshal. Lata Mangeshkar, Asha Bhosle, Jayita Pandey and Kavita Krishnamurthy are only non-bengali singers to win this award. Sabina Yasmin from Bangladesh is the one and only non-Indian singer to achieve this feat.

Here is a list of the award winners and the films for which they won.

See also

 Bengal Film Journalists' Association Awards
 Cinema of India

External links
 https://web.archive.org/web/20080229010408/http://www.bfjaawards.com/

Bengal Film Journalists' Association Awards
Music awards honoring women